Jianpi Wan is a blackish-brown pill used in Traditional Chinese medicine to "invigorate the spleen function and improve the appetite". It tastes slightly sweet and bitter. It is used where there is "weakness of the spleen and stomach marked by epigastric and abdominal distension, anorexia, and loose bowels". The binding agent is honey. Each pill weighs about 9 grams.

The original formula was first published in "Standards of Diagnosis and Treatment" (證治準繩 Zhèngzhì Zhǔnshéng) by Wáng Kěntáng (王肯堂) in 1602. It is known as the "Pill for Invigorating the Spleen".

Chinese classic herbal formula

See also
 Chinese classic herbal formula
 Bu Zhong Yi Qi Wan

References

Traditional Chinese medicine pills